The Peranap Coal Mine is a coal mine located in East Kalimantan. The mine has coal reserves amounting to 1.16 billion tonnes of coking coal, one of the largest coal reserves in Asia and the world.

See also 
List of mines in Indonesia

References 

Coal mines in Indonesia